Noble Investments v Keenan is a cited case in New Zealand regarding the awarding of damages under the Contractual Remedies Act where a contract has been cancelled.

References

New Zealand contract case law
2005 in New Zealand law
Court of Appeal of New Zealand cases
2005 in case law